The Italian passenger liner SS Tavolara was built in May 1910. It was renamed in 1910 as Terra Nova and in 1928 as Limbara. The ship was rebuilt during World War II and on 1 February 1944 commissioned as the German hospital ship Innsbruck. It was used for 84 patients. The ship was sunk during an air raid on 9–10 June 1944 at the pier in Trieste.

References

Maritime incidents in June 1944
1910 ships
Ships built on the River Clyde
Hospital ships in World War II
Merchant ships sunk by aircraft
World War II shipwrecks in the Mediterranean Sea